Cerdo may refer to:

 Cerdo (mythology), a Greek mythological figure 
 Cerdo (gnostic), a Syrian gnostic of the 2nd Century AD
 Kedron of Alexandria, an early patriarch of the Orthodox Church in Alexandria
 "Cerdo", a song by Molotov from their album ¿Dónde Jugarán las Niñas?